A partial solar eclipse occurred on June 29, 1946. A solar eclipse occurs when the Moon passes between Earth and the Sun, thereby totally or partly obscuring the image of the Sun for a viewer on Earth. A partial solar eclipse occurs in the polar regions of the Earth when the center of the Moon's shadow misses the Earth.

Related eclipses

Solar eclipses 1942–1946

References

External links 

1946 6 29
1946 in science
1946 6 29
June 1946 events